Adem Yze (born 21 September 1977) is a former Australian rules footballer who played for the Melbourne Football Club in the Australian Football League (AFL). In October 2019, he re-signed with Hawthorn Football Club and returned to the position of forwards coach in 2020, continuing as Head of Match Day Strategy & Opposition.

Yze, of Albanian descent, was educated at Galvin Park Secondary College in Werribee, Victoria. He has made the fourth-highest number of appearances in the history of the Melbourne Football Club.

AFL career

Taken at #16 in the 1994 National AFL Draft, and debuting in 1995 with Melbourne, he was a near-permanent fixture with the club throughout his career. He remained remarkably consistent in this time, moving from half-back to the midfield and towards the end of his playing career moving between half-forward and half-back. Yze led the league for kicks in 2001, 2002 and 2004, while coming third behind Scott Camporeale and Nathan Buckley in 2000.

In 2007, Yze struggled with his form during the pre-season. After a disappointing performance against St Kilda in Round 1, his streak of 226 consecutive AFL appearances was put to an end, with Melbourne deciding to drop him for the Round 2 game against Hawthorn. Yze was then selected for Melbourne's Round 4 match against Fremantle and picked up a career-high 38-possessions and kicked one goal, being named as one of the best on ground for the day. Despite seeing very little first-team action in 2008—the last year of his contract at Melbourne—Yze declared his intention to continue playing football, even if that meant he entered the draft or played at VFL level. At 30, Yze felt he could play on for another two or three years.

Due to Melbourne's youth policy introduced at the end of the 2008 season, Adem was delisted after only six senior appearances for the year, in which he kicked five goals. Yze expressed his desire to play on at another AFL club in 2009, declaring he would apply for the pre-season draft, yet he conceded he had "stuff all" chances of being picked up by another club. However, Yze declared he would play on regardless in 2009, even if it was at a suburban club, such as East Burwood, where his brother Damian played. Yze played with the Box Hill Hawks and joined the Shepparton Swans a year later.

In 2013 and 2014 he played with second division clubs Glen Orden and West Footscray in the Western Region Football League.

Yze was known for his straight kicks and ability to kick goals from seemingly impossible angles. He kicked five goals in a game on five occasions. He is also noted for being one of very few Muslims to play Australian rules professionally, although he does not actively practise Islam.

Coaching career

In January 2012, Yze joined Hawthorn as a part-time assistant coach.

On 14 November 2014, Yze replaced Luke Beveridge as Hawthorn's backline coach, after previously working with the Hawks as a specialist goal-kicking and development coach for the past three seasons. Yze was credited for played a key role in harnessing the Hawthorn players' elite kicking skills as they developed into the AFL's deadliest team in front of goal over the past two seasons, with the team's accuracy increasing from 48 per cent to 57.1 per cent during his tenure as goalkicking coach.

After six seasons as a  assistant coach Yze was appointed to the  coaching board for the 2021 Season. The Demons would have an outstanding 2021 season in which they finished on top of the ladder and were a dominant team throughout the regular season and the finals series which was capped off with a commanding victory over the Western Bulldogs to win the 2021 premiership. Adem Yze was a key architect in creating their league best defence that was a key factor in their historic premiership win. In the 2022 season Melbourne would continue their dominant ways extending the winning streak to 17 games, until the second half of the year in which momentum was halted and they struggled with consistency. Yze continued his role as midfield coach overseeing arguably the best midfield in the competition while their team defence still remained elite and one of the top in the competition. Near the end of the season Yze was heavily linked to the vacant GWS and later Essendon senior coaching role, however the role was eventually awarded to then Richmond assistant coach Adam Kingsley and Brad Scott.

Statistics

Playing statistics

|- style="background-color: #EAEAEA"
! scope="row" style="text-align:center" | 1995
|style="text-align:center;"|
| 44 || 9 || 3 || 4 || 55 || 23 || 78 || 17 || 8 || 0.3 || 0.4 || 6.1 || 2.6 || 8.7 || 1.9 || 0.9 || 0
|-
! scope="row" style="text-align:center" | 1996
|style="text-align:center;"|
| 13 || 19 || 9 || 8 || 136 || 40 || 176 || 48 || 16 || 0.5 || 0.4 || 7.2 || 2.1 || 9.3 || 2.5 || 0.8 || 0
|- style="background:#eaeaea;"
! scope="row" style="text-align:center" | 1997
|style="text-align:center;"|
| 13 || 19 || 9 || 16 || 203 || 34 || 237 || 62 || 21 || 0.5 || 0.8 || 10.7 || 1.8 || 12.5 || 3.3 || 1.1 || 0
|-
! scope="row" style="text-align:center" | 1998
|style="text-align:center;"|
| 13 || 25 || 7 || 5 || 394 || 95 || 489 || 110 || 37 || 0.3 || 0.2 || 15.8 || 3.8 || 19.6 || 4.4 || 1.5 || 0
|- style="background:#eaeaea;"
! scope="row" style="text-align:center" | 1999
|style="text-align:center;"|
| 13 || 22 || 10 || 5 || 269 || 79 || 348 || 54 || 26 || 0.5 || 0.2 || 12.2 || 3.6 || 15.8 || 2.5 || 1.2 || 0
|-
! scope="row" style="text-align:center" | 2000
|style="text-align:center;"|
| 13 || 25 || 37 || 23 || 411 || 123 || 534 || 104|| 42 || 1.5 || 0.9 || 16.4 || 4.9 || 21.4 || 4.2 || 1.7 || 14
|- style="background:#eaeaea;"
! scope="row" style="text-align:center" | 2001
|style="text-align:center;"|
| 13 || 22 || 24 || 26 || bgcolor="DD6E81"| 417 || 72 || 489 || 105 || 37 || 1.1 || 1.2 || bgcolor="b7e718"| 19.0 || 3.3 || 22.2 || 4.8 || 1.7 || 8
|-
! scope="row" style="text-align:center" | 2002
|style="text-align:center;"|
| 13 || 24 || 19 || 13 || bgcolor="DD6E81"| 441 || 105 || 546 || 106 || 67 || 0.8 || 0.5 || bgcolor="DD6E81"| 18.4 || 4.4 || 22.8 || 4.4 || 2.8 || 17
|-style="background:#eaeaea;"
! scope="row" style="text-align:center" | 2003
|style="text-align:center;"|
| 13 || 22 || 17 || 8 || 340 || 113 || 453 || 74 || 43 || 0.8 || 0.4 || 15.5 || 5.1 || 20.6 || 3.4 || 2.0 || 5
|-
! scope="row" style="text-align:center" | 2004
|style="text-align:center;"|
| 13 || 23 || 19 || 21 || bgcolor="DD6E81"| 410 || 104 || 514 || 99 || 54 || 0.8 || 0.9 || bgcolor="DD6E81"| 17.8 || 4.5 || 22.3 || 4.3 || 2.3 || 14
|-style="background:#eaeaea;"
! scope="row" style="text-align:center" | 2005
|style="text-align:center;"|
| 13 || 23 || 41 || 34 || 270 || 52 || 322 || 99 || 34 || 1.8 || 1.5 || 11.7 || 2.3 || 14.0 || 4.3 || 1.5 || 7
|-
! scope="row" style="text-align:center" | 2006
|style="text-align:center;"|
| 13 || 24 || 30 || 16 || 356 || 120 || 476 || 128 || 44 || 1.3 || 0.7 || 14.8 || 5.0 || 19.8 || 5.3 || 1.8 || 5
|-style="background:#eaeaea;"
! scope="row" style="text-align:center" | 2007
|style="text-align:center;"|
| 13 || 8 || 4 || 6 || 111 || 54 || 165 || 36 || 16 || 0.5 || 0.8 || 13.9 || 6.8 || 20.6 || 4.5 || 2.0 || 0
|-
! scope="row" style="text-align:center" | 2008
|style="text-align:center;"|
| 13 || 6 || 5 || 9 || 86 || 26 || 112 || 35 || 5 || 0.8 || 1.5 || 14.3 || 4.3 || 18.7 || 5.8 || 0.8 || 1
|- class="sortbottom"
! colspan=3| Career
! 271
! 234
! 194
! 3899
! 1040
! 4939
! 1077
! 450
! 0.9
! 0.7
! 14.4
! 3.8
! 18.2
! 4.0
! 1.7
! 71
|}

Coaching statistics

|- style="background-color: #EAEAEA"
! scope="row" style="text-align:center; font-weight:normal" | 2022*
|style="text-align:center;"|
| 1 || 1 || 0 || 0 || 100.0% || TBA || 18
|- 
! colspan=2| Career totals
! 1
! 1
! 0
! 0
! 100.00%
! colspan=2|
|}
* Caretaker coach

Honours and achievements

Individual
Keith 'Bluey' Truscott Medal: 2001
All-Australian: 2002
Australian Representative Honours in International Rules Football: 2000, 2002
AFL Rising Star Nominee: 1996 (Round 11)
Centenary Medal Award: 2001

References

External links

Melbourne Football Club players
All-Australians (AFL)
Keith 'Bluey' Truscott Trophy winners
Australian people of Albanian descent
People from Shepparton
Australian rules footballers from Victoria (Australia)
Murray Bushrangers players
Shepparton United Football Club players
Shepparton Swans Football Club players
1977 births
Living people
Australia international rules football team players